Tisdale is an unincorporated community in Cowley County, Kansas, United States.

History 
The post office was established December 1, 1871, and discontinued April 15, 1920. Tisdale once had three stores and several other buildings, and did a flourishing trade with the surrounding area until the spring of 1880 when the railroad was built four miles to the north through Burden, Kansas.

Geography 
Tisdale is a ghost town, located about six miles east of Winfield on US Route 160, near the Tisdale United Methodist Church, and west of State Highway 15.

Education
The community is served by Winfield USD 465 public school district.

References

Further reading

External links
 Cowley County maps: Current, Historic, KDOT

Unincorporated communities in Cowley County, Kansas
Unincorporated communities in Kansas